The Joe Louis Story is a 1953 American film noir drama sport film directed by Robert Gordon and starring Coley Wallace, Hilda Silmms and Paul Stewart.

Plot
Biographical film about the story of boxer Joe Louis and his rise from poverty to becoming heavyweight champion of the world.

Cast

References

External links 

1953 films
Film noir
1950s English-language films
1950s biographical drama films
1950s sports drama films
American boxing films
American biographical drama films
American sports drama films
Biographical films about sportspeople
American black-and-white films
Films directed by Robert Gordon
Cultural depictions of Joe Louis
1953 drama films
1950s American films